Williamstown High School is a public high school in Williamstown, West Virginia, United States.

Description
Williamstown High School accommodates grades 6-12 and has an enrollment of approximately 667 students. Williamstown High School has one feeder school, Williamstown-Waverly Elementary school, following the consolidation of Williamstown and Waverly elementary school.

History 
Williams District High School opened in the fall of 1905. The school consolidated Stapleton, Greenmont, Sand Hill, Pleasant Valley, Vienna, Williamstown, Oak Grove, Summit, Kinnaird, Plum Run, and Oak Lane Schools. It opened in two separate rooms on the second floor of the Henderson Building on Ferry St. A new building was constructed in 1908 that housed grades 1-12. In 1926, a contest was held to determine the school's seal. Kathleen Bee's design of a log cabin with a rising sun was declared the winner. in 1933, Williams District was dissolved and incorporated into Wood County School District. On December 1st, 1951, a new gymnasium-auditorium ("gymatorium") was built at the corner of West 5th St. and Williams Ave., declared in honor of Williamstown alumni that fought in World War I and World War II. Eventually, classrooms were added on to the building, resulting in the high school being relocated there in 1957. In 1974, several new classrooms as well as a library and cafeteria were added to the school. The school remained largely unchanged aside from maintenance until 2019, when a new track was added. Following this, in 2020, a new wing was added to the east side of the school. This wing housed new classrooms and science labs, a new auditorium, and a new room for the school's strings program. In 2022, work began on the construction of new stands for the football field, with the addition of an artificial turf field planned for 2023.

Williamstown (Williamstown-Waverly) Elementary School
The building that previously housed Williamstown High School was converted to a new Williamstown Elementary School, serving grades 1-6. The bell tower and 3rd floor, which was a gymnasium, were removed in 1975. The bell from said bell tower was mounted on wheels and is used at football games and at homecoming parades. Williamstown Elementary School was ;closed for the 2020-2021 school year, when a new Williamstown-Waverly Elementary School was built to consolidate students from Williamstown and Waverly Elementary students. Prior to this, both the aforementioned Williamstown Elementary as well as Waverly Elementary were feeder schools into Williamstown High School.

Sports 

WHS competes in the Single A level in West Virginia High School sports. It has held the LKC All Sports Award for more than 20 years (2003-2004 season excepted). 
Home of the 2008, 2014, and 2022 West Virginia Single A Football State Champions, the 2008 Sectional Soccer Champions, along with the 2015 Boys Soccer Sectional Champions and the 2016 Girls Soccer Sectional Champions. The 2016-17 Girls Basketball team were the #6 seed in the 2017 West Virginia Single A Girls' basketball tournament, advanced to their first championship game since 2003, where they lost to class A Huntington-St. Joseph.

In 2015, the boys' soccer team won their section with a combined score of 18–2. The ‘Jackets would advance to the regional championship game against, at the time, #8 Nationally Ranked Charleston Catholic, with a trip to the state championship tournament at stake. The Yellow Jackets fell short 2-1 and bowed out of the postseason. 

In the 2014 football season, Williamstown made it to Class “A” State Championship against 13-0 and tournament #1 overall seed St. Marys Blue Devils.  This ended the game at a score of 33-32 and gave Williamstown their second football state title in their history. As of July 2018, that is the last appearance by Williamstown in the football state championship game. They were defeated by eventual state champions Magnolia 14–13 in 2015, after a controversial refereeing decision negated a Williamstown touchdown late in the game. In 2016, they were defeated by eventual state runners-up East Hardy, and graduated many of their starting players from that year's team. 2017 was the worst year for Williamstown football under Coach Smith, as the team struggled all season to a 5–4 record, barely making the playoffs as the lowest seed (#16) and losing in the first round to #1 seed East Hardy by a respectable score of 14–10. In 2021, the Williamstown Yellow Jackets advanced to the Class "A" State Championship as #6 against 13-1 and tournament #4 seed and were defeated 42-21 by the Rebels of Ritchie County High School, earning the title of State Runner-Up.

In 2021, the Williamstown boys' basketball team won the LKC Class "A" championship for the first time since 1962.

Mascot, School Songs, and School Colors
The fight song of WHS is set to the tune of the song "Washington and Lee Swing".

The school's mascot is the Yellow Jackets, one among two West Virginia schools that use this mascot (see Moorefield High School). The colors are maroon and gold, colors also seen on the school's flag.

Music Programs

Band 

The "Pride of Williamstown" is Williamstown High School's marching band, The Pride accompanies Williamstown's Yellow Jackets to almost every football game, competes in several marching band competitions at 49 members as of 2022, and performs in local parades. The band went to Bands of America regional championships in the 1991 season. The band has also won numerous awards. After a dip in size and quality, the band has nearly doubled in size since 2019 thanks to current band director Mr. Jed Corra.

The Yellow Jacket Jazz Ensemble is Williamstown High School's jazz ensemble. It performs at concerts and attends ratings festivals.

Strings 
The Williamstown Strings program is unique in that it is the area's only independent strings program. It performs at concerts and is divided into high school, middle school, and elementary school sections.

Choir 
Williamstown High School has a high school choir and a middle school choir.

Notable alumni
 Alyssa Sauro, 1st place winner representing the U.S.A. on the girls' team at the 2022 International U18 Mountain Running Cup in Saluzzo, Italy

References

External links 
 GreatSchools.net - WHS evaluation and statistics
 Williamstown High School
 
 
 

Public high schools in West Virginia
Schools in Wood County, West Virginia